Esports at the 2009 Asian Indoor Games was held in Gymnasium of Hanoi Technology, Vietnam from 1 November to 4 November 2009. There were five video games in the competition, FIFA 09, NBA Live 08, Need for Speed: Most Wanted, StarCraft: Brood War, Counter-Strike 1.6 and DotA Allstars.

Medalists

Medal table

Results

FIFA 09

Round 1
1–2 October

Group A

Group B

Group C

Group D

Knockout round

NBA Live 08
2–3 October

Need for Speed: Most Wanted

Round 1
1 October

Group A

Group B

Knockout round
2 October

StarCraft: Brood War

Round 1
3 October

Group A

Group B

Final round
4 October

Counter-Strike 1.6
2–4 October

DotA Allstars
1 October

References 
 Official site

2009 Asian Indoor Games events
2009
2009 in esports